California Storm is an American women's soccer team, founded in 1995 as the Sacramento Storm, before changing its name the following season. The team is a member of the Women's Premier Soccer League and the USL W League, both amateur women's leagues in the United States. The team plays in the North Division of the Pacific Conference in the WPSL and in the NorCal Division for the USL W League.  The team was a founding member of the W-League, then left in 1998 to become one of the founding teams of the WPSL. It returned in 2022 and will field a team in both leagues.

The team plays its home games in the stadium of Davis Legacy Sports Complex in Davis, California but considers Sacramento, California its home and regularly holds free soccer clinics throughout the region. The club's colors are white and navy blue.

The California Storm have won the PacNorth Conference seven times, including 2016, 2017 and 2019. They have won a WPSL record of 4 National Championships (1999, 2002, 2004 and 2022). Their 2020 WPSL season was cancelled due to the pandemic but in that time, they added new sponsors, signed with Puma, and started a U-21 team.

Year-by-year

Current squad
As of 31 March 2020.

Former notable players

 Alex Morgan
 Remy Siemsen
 Brandi Chastain
 Leslie Osborne
 Sissi
 Julie Foudy
 Jennifer Cudjoe

Honours
 WPSL Pacific North Division Champions 2008, 2009, 2010, 2014, 2015, 2017, 2019
 WPSL Pacific NorCal Division Champions 2016
 WPSL West Division Champions 2005
 WPSL North Division Champions 2002, 2003
 WPSL Regular Season Champions 1999
 W-League Western Division Champions 1997
 WPSL Champions 2022
 WPSL Champions 2004
 WPSL Champions 2002
 WPSL Champions 1999

Head coaches
  Jerry Zanelli (1995–2018)
  Jamie Levoy (2019–present)

Stadia

Elk Grove High School 2014
 Stadium at Natomas High School; Sacramento, California 2008–2010
 Stadium at Esperanza High School; Anaheim, California 2008 (1 game)
 Stadium at Inderkum High School; Sacramento, California 2008 (2 games)

Front Office

Board of Directors

References

External links
 WPSL California Storm page
 Official California Storm Women's Soccer

Women's Premier Soccer League teams
Soccer clubs in Sacramento, California
Women's soccer clubs in California
USL W-League (1995–2015) teams
Association football clubs established in 1995
Women's sports in California
1995 establishments in California